Tapapa is a rural community in the Waikato region of New Zealand's North Island.

Marae

The area has two marae.

Tāpapa Marae is a traditional meeting ground for the Ngāti Raukawa hapū of Ngāti Tūkorehe, Rangitawhia and Te Rangi. In October 2020, the Government committed $1,259,392 from the Provincial Growth Fund to upgrade Tāpapa Marae and 7 other Ngāti Raukawa marae, creating 18 jobs.

Ruapeka Marae and Rangimarie meeting house is a meeting place of the Ngāti Raukawa hapū of Ngāti Tūkorehe. In October 2020, the Government committed $497,510 from the Provincial Growth Fund to upgrade the Ruapeka Marae, creating an estimate 68 jobs.

References

External links
 Tirau's official website

Populated places in Waikato
South Waikato District